Zeng Lili (13 February 1942 – 18 July 2018), better known by her pen name Ling Li, was a Chinese writer and historian. She was born in Yan'an. Her ancestral home is Yudu County, Jiangxi Province. She graduated from PLA's Xi'an Institute of Telecommunication Engineering (now Xidian University). Having worked as a missile engineer for 12 years, she transferred to the institute of Qing Dynasty History at Renmin University and became a scholar. She was the vice chairman of the Beijing Writers Association, and a member of Chinese Writers Association's 6th committee. She was awarded the Lao She Literary Award in 2000.

Works 
Son of Heaven
Guan River of Broken Dreams
暮鼓晨钟
星星草
倾城倾国

External links
Ling Li's profile on sina.com 

1942 births
2018 deaths
Writers from Yan'an
Historians from Shaanxi
Lao She Literary Award
People's Republic of China historians
Chinese women novelists
Mao Dun Literature Prize laureates
Chinese women historians